The Psychedelic Swamp is the eighth album by psychedelic rock band Dr. Dog. It was recorded in 2001 and intended to be their debut album, but was rehashed, reproduced, and eventually released on February 5, 2016.  It is the band's fourth release on the Anti- record label, and is a revamped version of their unreleased debut LP. The album was produced and engineered by Nathan Sabatino.

Release
The album was made available for streaming on NPR's website on January 27, 2016, 9 days before it was released. Two tracks were also made available prior to the album's release - "Badvertise" was released on November 6, 2015, followed with "Bring My Baby Back" on January 5, 2016.

Reception

The Psychedelic Swamp  received positive reviews from critics. On Metacritic, the album holds a score of 72/100 based on 9 reviews, indicating "generally favorable reviews".

Track listing

Personnel
Dr. Dog
Toby Leaman - bass, vocals, production, engineering
Scott McMicken - guitar, vocals, production, engineering
Frank McElroy - guitar, vocals, production, engineering
Zach Miller - keyboards, production, engineering
Eric Slick - drums, production, engineering
Dimitri Manos - percussion, Meatball's palace, production, engineering
Doug O'Donnell - guitar, vocals, production, engineering

Additional personnel
Nathan Sabatino – production, engineering
Brian Lucey – mastering
Tom Beach – technical assistance
Matt Saunders – artwork
Mary McCool – backing vocals (4, 6, 8)
Mel Krodman – backing vocals (4, 6, 8)
Eppchez – backing vocals (4, 6, 8)
Mr. Tidypaws – saxophone (8)

References

External links
First Listen: Dr. Dog, "The Psychedelic Swamp" by NPR.

2016 albums
Dr. Dog albums
Anti- (record label) albums